John Montgomery or Montgomerie may refer to:

Politicians
John Montgomery (Leominster MP), 14th-century MP for Leominster
John Montgomerie (Ayrshire MP) (1680–1731), MP for Ayrshire 1710–27
John Montgomerie (died 1725), Scottish businessman and politician, MP for Linlithgowshire 1704–7, for Buteshire 1710
John Montgomery (Continental Congress) (1722–1808), U.S. merchant, continental congressman for Pennsylvania
John Montgomery (Maryland politician) (1764–1828), U.S. lawyer, congressman from Maryland
John Montgomery (Oklahoma politician), member of the Oklahoma Senate
John Montgomery (shipbuilder) (1800–1867), Canadian shipbuilder, merchant and politician in New Brunswick
John Flournoy Montgomery (1878–1954), U.S. ambassador to Hungary during World War II
John Gallagher Montgomery (1805–1857), U.S. lawyer, congressman for Pennsylvania
John M. Montgomery (1843–1895), Canadian politician from Prince Edward Island
John Montgomery (died 1733), Irish M.P. for County Monaghan, Ireland
John Montgomery (1747–1797), Irish soldier and M.P
John Montgomery (died 1741) (1719–1741), M.P. for County Monaghan, Ireland

Military
John Montgomery (pioneer) (1750–1794), American Revolutionary officer and pioneer in Illinois and Tennessee
John B. Montgomery (1794–1872), United States Navy admiral

Sports
John Montgomery (footballer), Scottish footballer
John Montgomery (equestrian) (1881–1948), American horse rider and Olympic medalist
John Montgomerie (chess player) (1911–1995), Scottish chess player

Others
John Montgomery (tavern-keeper) (1788–1879), Canadian tavern-keeper in 1837 Rebellion
John Joseph Montgomery (1858–1911), U.S. pioneer in aviation
John Warwick Montgomery (born 1931), American legal academic 
John Montgomery (art historian) (1951–2005), Pre-Columbian art historian
John R. Montgomery, advertising industry veteran and television producer
John Michael Montgomery (born 1965), country singer
J. Alastair Montgomerie (1914–1989), Scottish businessman and Royal Navy officer
John Leslie Montgomery (aka Wes Montgomery) (1923–1968), American jazz guitarist

See also

John Montgomerie (died 1731), Scottish-American colonial governor
John Montgomerie Bell (1804–1862), Scottish lawyer

Jack Montgomery (disambiguation)
Montgomery (disambiguation)
John (disambiguation)